Alparslan Yamanoğlu is a Turkish karateka. He won one of the bronze medals in the men's kumite +84 kg event at the 2018 World Karate Championships held in Madrid, Spain. He also won the silver medal in the men's team kumite event.

Achievements

References 

Living people
Year of birth missing (living people)
Place of birth missing (living people)
Turkish male karateka
Islamic Solidarity Games medalists in karate
Islamic Solidarity Games competitors for Turkey
21st-century Turkish people